Scooby-Doo! Shaggy's Showdown is a 2017 direct-to-DVD animated western comedy mystery film, and the twenty-eighth entry in the direct-to-video series of Scooby-Doo films. It was released digitally on January 31, 2017, and on DVD on February 14, 2017.

Plot
The gang is in the Mystery Machine on their way to Shaggy's cousin Tawny's ranch in Sorgum City, where she's invited him and his friends to get to know him better. The gang appears lost, and Daphne suggests asking directions. Shaggy volunteers to go ask, but everyone he approaches runs away screaming. Daphne successfully gets directions before the man she is talking to spots Shaggy and runs off screaming.

The gang make their way to the ranch, where Scooby and Shaggy stay inside the van due to everyone who sees him freaking out. The rest of the gang meet Midge and Andy, and their children Desdemona and Buddy G, who is a famous internet video star that Daphne is a huge fan of and is performing at an upcoming rodeo. Midge introduces them to television producers Dave and David, and sisters Carol and Sharon who are continuously pranking each other, and the ranch hands Larry and Kyle. When the ranch hands announce that it is time for lunch and Shaggy and Scooby burst out of the van, causing everyone to scream that he is a ghost. The gang explains Shaggy is not a ghost and they learn that the reason everyone is afraid of Shaggy is because he resembles a ghost who's been terrorizing the area. 

A ranch owner named Rafe takes Shaggy and everyone else inside where his cousin Tawny and Rafe examine him and explain that he looks identical to the ghost of Dapper Jack. Rafe then tells the tale of Dapper Jack, the outlaw and villain of Sorghum City. He terrorized Sorghum City as a cattle thief, bank robber and general all-around bad guy, along with his dog Atlas. Dapper Jack was taken down by Sheriff Rufus Carmichael, and the legend is used to help bring tourism to Sorghum City. However, Dapper Jack's ghost has been attacking and driving away all the local businesses. That night, the gang hear screams, and run towards the sound to find Dapper Jack attacking the barn with guns that shoot green fire. Dapper Jack manages to escape capture and disappears.

The next day Daphne and Velma learn Tawny is in danger of losing her family ranch to the Black Rattler Company, which has been buying up all the closing business for cheap because of the Dapper Jack attacks. Tawny suggest they learn more about Dapper Jack in Town, and give Velma a break from the horses.

After enjoying some activities at the ranch Shaggy, Scooby and Fred search for clues, where they bump into Zeke, the shortsighted horse handler, and Fred discovers some mysterious powder. Tawny identifies it as Boric Acid, and says it should not be where it is because it is used as a pesticide, worrying again about losing the ranch. Zeke reveals that legend of Dapper Jack told for tourism is not the real story. In town, Daphne and Velma investigate the Museum where they discover that Sheriff Carmichael's diary has been stolen. The Museum attendant explains he didn't know the diary exists and reveals that anyone could have taken it as he does not lock the place.

At the ranch, the cowboys teach Shaggy, Fred, and Scooby how to ride horses where Shaggy proves to be a natural, but Buggy G refuses to participate because of his fear of horses. Later that evening, Dapper Jack makes another appearance and sets fire to the barn and turns an unruly horse named Buckstitch loose. Buckstitch bucks up Shaggy and Scooby while running wild, and Scooby talks the horse down, saving the day. While the gang discusses suspects, Fred spots Dave and David putting a case in the boot of a car, and the gang decides to follow them as they look suspicious.

Out on a ridge, Dave and David start to unpack the case while the gang peeks from behind a rock and discover Dave and David were actually scouting locations for a movie about Dapper Jack, and they suggest checking out Dapper Jack's grave. The gang heads over to the graveyard and find the grave, where they find a glowing message in the tombstone and the ghost of Dapper Jack appears and chases them. The gang is chased to the canoe rental station and make their way down the river, but Dapper Jack shoots down a tree forcing them to take a dangerous path, where they get caught up in the rapids approaching a waterfall. Shaggy lassos a tree but the branch breaks off, however it catches between two rocks, saving them just before they go over the waterfall.

By morning, they have made it to the bottom, and Tawny comes to find them. She drops them off at the graveyard and Mystery Machine, where Velma discovers that the writing on the grave is in UV powder and Scooby finds a set of speakers. Back at the ranch, Tawny is setting up for the barn dance, and the gang starts to help. They find out that she uses UV powder to decorate, and anyone can get at it because it sits in the unlocked barn. She then reveals she is going to lose the ranch because she can't afford the next mortgage payment, and Shaggy offers to enter the Rodeo Bronco taming competition to win the money to pay the mortgage, planning to win it by having Scooby talk to the horse beforehand and calm it down.

At the stadium, before the rodeo, Buddy G gives a special performance, where Carol and Sharon are revealed to be his backup dancers. During the song, Shaggy and Scooby join in the dancing. After the song ends, Scooby gets distracted and forgets to talk to the horse before Shaggy starts, and helps Buddy G overcome his fear of horses to participate in the parade before the rodeo. Shaggy successfully rides the bronco, despite Scooby not talking to the horse, and wins the Rodeo. Dapper Jack storms into the stadium, and unleashes a cattle stampede, interrupting the celebration, and Fred, Velma and Daphne spring their trap, but Dapper Jack cuts through the net, escaping easily. The gang manages to slow and divert the stampede using Velma's sneezes from her horse allergy to spook them, stopping the cattle trampling Tawny, Midge, Larry, Desdemona and Buddy.

Back at the ranch, Shaggy is awarded the trophy and money for winning, and he immediately gives it to Tawny to save the ranch. Velma and Daphne oust Kyle as the ghost of Dapper Jack by using a UV light to expose the UV Powder used on the net at the rodeo to tag Dapper Jack. Fred and Velma agree that there had to be another person helping, but they do not know who, so they head off to investigate Kyle's room. In his room, they find a hidden safe with the mask and special guns he used, along with Sheriff Carmichael's diary and a Black Rattler business card, causing Velma to exclaim that she knows who did it.

The gang heads back to the dance, where Velma reads a part of the diary over the mic, explaining that Sheriff Carmichael actually framed and later murdered Dapper Jack, who was, in reality, a kind and generous person and also an amazing horseman. Velma exposes Rafe of being the co-conspirator and he is caught in a lasso, where he explains his motive is buying up all the land to sell it at great profit to another company. Velma figured out it was him because he used El Cabong font on both the Black Rattler and Ranch websites, but Rafe escapes the lasso and steals the money, a gun and the stagecoach. Tawny is worried about losing the money, and Buddy G jumps on Scooby Doo to chase Rafe. Larry says the only horse fast enough to catch the stagecoach is Buckstitch, and Shaggy flies by on the horse towards Rafe, with Fred lighting up the sky with fireworks so he can see. Scooby knocks the gun out of Rafe's hand before he can shoot Shaggy and takes the trophy and money back, and Buddy G unhooks the horses from the stagecoach, leaving Rafe without any horses. Rafe's coach goes over the side of the road and crashes, and he mistakes Shaggy for Dapper Jack before he passes out.

Rafe gets arrested the next morning, and Tawny celebrates. She promises is going to tell the true story of Dapper Jack and replace the tourist lure with the villainous Sheriff Carmichael. Shaggy wants to know why he cannot grow a full beard like Dapper Jack does, and everyone laughs before the gang drives off into the sunrise. On their way, Shaggy and Scooby spots the real spirit of Dapper Jack on a ridge, and Jack gives Shaggy a nod of gratitude for clearing his name before disappear.

Cast
Frank Welker as Scooby-Doo and Fred Jones
Matthew Lillard as Shaggy Rogers
Grey Griffin as Daphne Blake
Kate Micucci as Velma Dinkley
Carlos Alazraqui as Larry
Max Charles as Buddy G
Gary Cole as Rafe
Jessica DiCicco as Desdemona Gunderson
Tania Gunadi as Carol
Eric Ladin as Kyle
Nolan North as David and Dave
Stephen Tobolowsky as Andy Gunderson
Lauren Tom as Sharon
Melissa Villaseñor as Tawny Rogers
Kari Wahlgren as Midge Gunderson
Gary Anthony Williams as Cook
John Schwab as Dapper Jack Rogers

References

External links

Official trailer
Official trailer 2

2010s English-language films
2010s American animated films
2010s Western (genre) comedy films
2017 direct-to-video films
2017 animated films
2017 films
American Western (genre) comedy films
Western (genre) animated films
Scooby-Doo direct-to-video animated films
Warner Bros. Animation animated films
Warner Bros. direct-to-video animated films
American children's animated comedy films
2017 comedy films
2010s children's animated films
American children's animated mystery films
Films directed by Matt Peters